Walter Enholtz (1875–1961) was a Swiss painter. He was best known for his water colors, still lives and self-portraits.  One of the favorite sites for his paintings was located in the canton of Tessin.

References
This article was initially translated from the German Wikipedia.

19th-century Swiss painters
Swiss male painters
20th-century Swiss painters
1875 births
1961 deaths
19th-century Swiss male artists
20th-century Swiss male artists